The Grand Hyatt Lanko (in Chinese: 浪高·君悦大酒店/君悦A座) was a planned 258 metre (846 foot) tall, 60-story skyscraper located in the Nan'an District of Chongqing, China.

See also
 List of skyscrapers

References

Skyscrapers in Chongqing
Hotel buildings completed in 2004
2004 establishments in China
Skyscraper hotels in Chongqing
History of Chongqing
Tourism in Chongqing